The following page lists some of the power stations in Vietnam.

Coal 
Source : Initial query Coal Tracker, updated with data from MOIT 2019 Report 58/BC-CBT, updated using press releases, updated from PDP 7A

Gas turbines
Source : updated with data from Ministry of Industry and Trade (MOIT) 2019 Report 58/BC-CBT, updated with Decision 125/QD-DTDL, updated using press releases.

Updated with data from Ministry of Industry and Trade (MOIT) 2019 Report 58/BC-CBT, updated with Decision 125/QD-DTDL, updated using press releases.

Solar power plants 
Source: Initial query from DEVI Renewable Energies, updated using press releases

Note: Construction start + COD Date form: day/month/year

Wind power plants 
Source: Initial query from DEVI Renewable Energies,  795/TTG-CN

Note: Construction start + COD Date form: day/month/year

Biomass 
This section mentions both plants using Biomass products (bagasse,...) and Municipal solid waste (MSW).

Source : updated using press releases.

Hydroelectricity  
This section mentions only medium and large hydro power plants (capacity >= 30 MW).

Source : updated with data from Ministry of Industry and Trade (MOIT) 2019 Report 58/BC-CBT, updated using press releases.

Notes

For solar, wind power plants

For gas, coal-fired power plants 

 Announced: Projects that are in the planning decision of the government or companies but have not yet obtained a permit or permission for land use rights, coal supply rights...
 Pre-permit development: Projects have started to implement one of the following items: environmental licenses, land and water use rights, financial security, transmission contract guarantees, etc.
 Permitted: Projects that have been licensed for environmental licenses but have not yet begun to break ground.
 Construction: Projects are being built after the groundbreaking ceremony.
 Shelved: Projects do not have specific information on the project's progress but do not have enough information to declare the project canceled.
 Cancelled: Projects are not progressing after a very long time with no information about the project; Projects converted to natural gas are considered to have not used coal anymore; projects have appeared in government documents but then disappeared.
 Operating: Projects with an official date of Commercial Operation Date (COD).

See also 
 List of power stations in Asia
 List of largest power stations in the world
 Energy in Vietnam
 Renewable energy in Vietnam

References

External links 

Vietnam
 
Power stations